Harold Segerson Mahony (13 February 1867 – 27 June 1905) was a Scottish-born Irish tennis player who is best known for winning the singles title at the Wimbledon Championships in 1896. His career lasted from 1888 until his death in 1905. Mahony was born in Scotland but lived in Ireland for the majority of his life; his family were Irish including both of his parents, the family home was in County Kerry, Southwestern Ireland. He was the last Scottish born man to win Wimbledon until the victory of Andy Murray at the 2013 championships.

Career
Mahony was born at 21 Charlotte Square, Edinburgh to Richard John Mahony, an Irish barrister and prominent landowner. The family had a home in Scotland but spent most of their time at Dromore Castle, in County Kerry, Ireland. Harold trained on a specially built tennis court at Dromore.

Mahony made his Wimbledon debut in 1890 exiting in the first round. He reached the semifinal in 1891 and 1892. Mahony spent some time in America in the mid-1890s, before returning to England and finally taking the Wimbledon crown in 1896. In the final he beat Wilfred Baddeley of Great Britain in five sets. Under the challenger system Mahony was entitled to defend the Wimbledon title in 1897 but this time he was beaten in the Challenge Round in three straight sets by Reginald Doherty. He was the last Scottish-born player to win a grand slam until Andy Murray won the US Open in 2012 and win Wimbledon until Murray won it in 2013. He was recognised as the third and last Irishman to win the Wimbledon singles.

He won the singles title at the British Covered Court Championships, played at the Queen's Club in London, in 1893 and successfully defended his title the following year. In 1895 Mahony forfeited the defence of his title due to illness. In 1898 he won the singles titles at the prestigious Irish Championships. That same year Mahony, who was a regular competitor in Germany and spoke fluent German, also won the singles title at the German Championships.

At the 1900 Summer Olympics in Paris he won a silver medal in the men's singles event and a bronze medal in the doubles competition (for Great Britain and Ireland), as well as a silver medal in the mixed doubles event with Hélène Prévost from France. Mahony won the Kent Championships in 1899, defeating Wilberforce Eaves in the final, and in 1904, defeating Brame Hillyard in the final.

Mahony was a member of the 1903 British Isles Davis Cup team that won the against the United States at the Longwood Cricket Club in Boston but did not play in the event. When four-time Wimbledon champion Reginald Doherty had a shoulder injury the British team captain William Collins elected to forfeit his first match, instead of letting Mahony play, so that Doherty would be allowed to play the reverse singles match later in the event.

Mahony was 1.91m (6 ft 3in) tall and possessed a formidable backhand. His forehand was less notable: his fellow player, George Hillyard, wrote that he "never did acquire the right method of hitting the ball on the forehand".

Mahony was killed on 27 June 1905, aged 38, in a bicycling accident while descending a steep hill near Caragh Lake in Co. Kerry.

Grand Slam finals

Singles

Doubles

Olympic finals

Singles: 1 (1 silver medal)

Mixed Doubles: 1 (1 silver medal)

Challenge Rounds
Challenge Round: the final round of a tournament, in which the winner of a single-elimination phase (final) faces the previous year's champion, who plays only that one match. The challenge round was used in the early history of tennis (from 1877 through 1921), in some tournaments not all. (**) denotes challenge round

Career finals

Singles 86 (43 titles, 43 runner-ups)

References

External links

 

1867 births
1905 deaths
19th-century Irish people
19th-century male tennis players
Scottish male tennis players
Irish male tennis players
Olympic bronze medallists for Great Britain
Olympic silver medallists for Great Britain
Olympic tennis players of Great Britain
People from Kenmare
Cycling road incident deaths
Sportspeople from Edinburgh
Tennis players at the 1900 Summer Olympics
Wimbledon champions (pre-Open Era)
Olympic medalists in tennis
Grand Slam (tennis) champions in men's singles
Medalists at the 1900 Summer Olympics
Road incident deaths in the Republic of Ireland
British male tennis players